The Curtiss XP-62 was a prototype single-engine interceptor aircraft, that was built at the request of the United States Army Air Forces, by the Curtiss-Wright Corporation. It first flew in 1943.

Relatively unusual objectives of the design, for its time, included superior high-altitude performance, which was to be assisted by a pressurized cockpit, heavier armament than contemporary USAAF fighter aircraft, in the form of four 20 mm autocannons, and higher speeds, at all altitudes, than other contemporary fighters. A key physical feature of the XP-62, in terms of the above objectives, was its relatively large and powerful engine, an 18-cylinder Wright R-3350 Duplex-Cyclone.

Design and development
The terms of the contract, in accordance with a proposal of 29 April 1941, called for the first flight within fifteen months of the award.

The maximum level flight speed at 27,000 ft (8,230 m) had to be at least 468 mph (753 km/h).

The aircraft was to feature an air-conditioned, pressurized cockpit.

Proposed armament was either eight 20 mm (.79 in) cannons or twelve 0.50 in (12.7 mm) machine guns, mounted in the wings.

Two prototypes were ordered; the first designated XP-62 and the second designated XP-62A.

On 2 August 1941, the specifications were submitted for the XP-62 reducing the maximum speed to 448 mph (721 km/h) with eight 20 mm (.79 in) cannon armament and increasing the loaded weight by 1,537 lb (697 kg).

During a project review of 1 January 1942, the contract specification was again revised: the loaded weight would be reduced by eliminating four cannons and removing the propeller de-icing equipment.

On 25 May 1942 a contract for 100 P-62 fighters was awarded. However, on 27 July 1942, before production could begin, the contract for the P-62 was terminated (although not, apparently, the XP-62A). The reason given was the effect on deliveries of Curtiss-built P-47 Thunderbolts.

While work on the XP-62A continued, it progressed slowly, owing to its low priority; delays in delivery of the unique pressure-cabin supercharger and engine modifications delayed the first flight until 21 July 1943. Only a limited amount of flight testing was carried out before the XP-62A was canceled on 21 September 1943 and full performance characteristics were not obtained. In early 1944, the XP-62A prototype was scrapped.

Specifications (XP-62)

See also

References

 Green, William. War Planes of the Second World War – Fighters, Volume 4. London: Macdonald. 1961.

External links

Curtis XP-62 – National Museum of the USAF

Curtiss P-62
Single-engined tractor aircraft
P-62
Aircraft with contra-rotating propellers
Aircraft first flown in 1943